Taktakan is a district of Serang Municipality, the capital city of Banten, Indonesia. It's the westernmost district of the city which borders the regency.

The municipal landfill, TPAS Cilowong, is located in the west part of the district.

Kelurahan (Administrative Villages)
Taktakan District is divided into thirteen kelurahan or administrative villages: 

Cibendung
Cilowong
Drangong
Kalang Anyar
Kuranji
Lialang
Pancur
Panggungjati
Sayar
Sepang
Taktakan
Tamanbaru
Umbul Tengah

References

Serang